This is a list of schools in North Tyneside, Tyne and Wear, England.

State-funded schools

Primary and first schools

Amberely Primary School, Killingworth
Appletree Gardens First School, Monkseaton
Backworth Park Primary School, Backworth
Bailey Green Primary School, Killingworth
Balliol Primary School, Longbenton
Battle Hill Primary School, Wallsend
Benton Dene Primary School, Longbenton
Burradon Community Primary School, Burradon
Carville Primary School, Wallsend
Christ Church CE Primary School, North Shields
Collingwood Primary School, North Shields
Coquet Park First School, Whitley Bay
Cullercoats Primary School, Cullercoats
Denbigh Community Primary School, Howdon
Fordley Primary School, Dudley
Forest Hall Primary School, Forest Hall
Grasmere Academy, Killingworth
Greenfields Community Primary School, Wideopen
Hadrian Park Primary School,  Wallsend
Hazelwood Community Primary School, Wideopen
Holystone Primary School, Holystone
Ivy Road Primary School, Forest Hall
King Edward Primary School, Preston
Kings Priory School, Tynemouth
Langley First School, Monkseaton
Marine Park First School, Whitley Bay
Monkhouse Primary School, North Shields
New York Primary School, North Shields
Percy Main Primary School, Percy Main
Preston Grange Primary School, Preston
Redesdale Primary School, Wallsend
Richardson Dees Primary School, Wallsend
Riverside Primary School, North Shields
Rockcliffe First school, Whitley Bay
St Aidan's RC Primary School, Wallsend
St Bartholomew's CE Primary School, Longbenton
St Bernadette's RC Primary, Wallsend
St Columba's RC Primary School, Wallsend
St Cuthbert's RC Primary School, North Shields
St Joseph's RC Primary School, Chirton
St Mary's RC Primary School, Cullercoats
St Mary's RC Primary School, Forest Hall
St Stephen's RC Primary School, Longbenton
Shiremoor Primary School, Shiremoor
South Wellfield First School, Wellfield
Southridge First School, Whitley Bay
Spring Gardens Primary School, North Shields
Star of the Sea RC Primary School, Whitley Bay
Stephenson Memorial Primary School, Wallsend
Wallsend Jubilee Primary School, Wallsend
Wallsend St Peter's CE Primary School, Wallsend
Waterville Primary School, North Shields
Western Community Primary School, Wallsend
Westmoor Primary School, Killingworth
Whitehouse Primary School, North Shields
Whitley Lodge First School, Whitley Bay

Middle schools
Marden Bridge Middle School, Whitley Bay
Monkseaton Middle School, Monkseaton
Valley Gardens Middle School, Monkseaton
Wellfield Middle School, Wellfield

Secondary and upper schools

Burnside College, Wallsend
Churchill Community College, Wallsend
George Stephenson High School, Killingworth
John Spence Community High School, North Shields
Kings Priory School, Tynemouth
Longbenton High School, Longbenton
Marden High School, Marden
Monkseaton High School, Monkseaton
Norham High School, North Shields
North Gosforth Academy, Seaton Burn
St Thomas More Roman Catholic Academy, North Shields
Whitley Bay High School, Whitley Bay

Special and alternative schools
Beacon Hill School, Wallsend
Benton Dene School, Longbenton
Moorbridge, Shiremoor
Silverdale School, Howdon
Southlands School, Tynemouth
Woodlawn School, Monkseaton

Further education
Tyne Metropolitan College

Independent schools

Special and alternative schools
Hopespring Newcastle, Longbenton
ID Academy, Seaton Burn
Parkside House School, Backworth
Percy Hedley School, Killingworth

References 

North Tyneside
Schools in the Metropolitan Borough of North Tyneside
Lists of buildings and structures in Tyne and Wear